Trnovo is a village and municipality in Martin District in the Žilina Region of northern Slovakia.

History
In historical records the village was first mentioned in 1256.

Geography
The municipality lies at an altitude of 460 metres and covers an area of 7.444 km². It has a population of about 217 people.

External links
http://www.statistics.sk/mosmis/eng/run.html

Villages and municipalities in Martin District